Persegi Gianyar (registered as Persegi Bali FC) was an Indonesian football club based in Gianyar Regency.

History
When club named Persegi Gianyar, the club hit by financial difficulties in 2005 and decided to dissolve the club. This led to an opportunity for other clubs from Bali to merge and form a club using Persegi Gianyar's license to compete in the Liga Indonesia. Local clubs such as Perseden Denpasar, Persekaba Badung and Perst Tabanan merged with Persegi Gianyar to form a new club called Persegi Bali FC.

References

Defunct football clubs in Indonesia
Football clubs in Indonesia
2006 establishments in Indonesia
2011 disestablishments in Indonesia
Association football clubs disestablished in 2011